You Ruined New York City for Me is the second extended play by American pop singer Fletcher, released on August 16, 2019 via Capitol Records. It did not chart in the United States, but the lead single "Undrunk" became Fletcher's first song to chart on the Billboard Hot 100, peaking at number 61 in 2019.

Track listing

References

External links
 
 

2019 EPs
Albums produced by Malay (record producer)
Capitol Records EPs
Fletcher (singer) EPs